"Closer to Free" is a 1993 song by American rock band BoDeans featured on their fifth studio album, Go Slow Down. It is the band's biggest hit, peaking at number 16 on the US Billboard Hot 100, number 11 in Australia, and number one in Canada after its re-release in 1996. It was featured as the theme of the TV series Party of Five.

Track listings
US 7-inch, CD, and cassette single (1995, 1996)
 "Closer to Free" (studio album version) – 3:09
 "Closer to Free" (live album version) – 3:54

Australian CD single (1994)
 "Closer to Free"
 "Texas Ride Song"
 "Idaho"

European and Australian CD single (1996)
 "Closer to Free"
 "She's a Runaway"
 "Don't Be Lonely"

Charts

Weekly charts

Year-end charts

In popular culture
"Closer to Free" was featured as the theme of the TV series Party of Five and was featured on the show's accompanying soundtrack. The song was also played in the 1994 film Milk Money and during the opening credits of the 1995 film Heavyweights.

References

1993 singles
1993 songs
1996 singles
Reprise Records singles
RPM Top Singles number-one singles
Slash Records singles
Song recordings produced by T Bone Burnett
Songs written for films
Television drama theme songs